Unión Deportiva Barbastro is a Spanish football team based in Barbastro, in the autonomous community of Aragon. Founded in 1934, it plays in Regional Preferente de Aragón, holding home games at Estadio Municipal de Deportes, with capacity of 5,000 seats.

Season to season

2 seasons in Segunda División B
43 seasons in Tercera División
24 seasons in Categorías Regionales

Honours

 Tercera División

Winners (2): 1988–89, 2004–05
 Runners-up (5): 1990–91, 1991–92, 1996–97, 2005–06, 2007–08

Famous players
 Sergio Barila
 Francisco Borrego
 Miguel Linares
 José Antonio Métola
 Eduardo Navarro

References

External links
Official website 

 
Football clubs in Aragon
Divisiones Regionales de Fútbol clubs
Association football clubs established in 1947
1947 establishments in Spain